The 2006 Democracy Movement is a name given to the political agitations against the direct and undemocratic rule of King Gyanendra of Nepal. The movement is also sometimes referred to as Jana Andolan II ("People's Movement II"), implying it being a second phase of the 1990 Jana Andolan.

Reinstitution of Parliament

In a nationally televised address, King Gyanendra reinstated the old Nepal House of Representatives on April 24, 2006.
The King called upon the Seven Party Alliance (SPA) to bear the responsibility of taking the nation on the path to national unity and prosperity while ensuring permanent peace and safeguarding multiparty democracy.

The reinstitution of Parliament was accepted by the SPA. It declared that Girija Prasad Koirala would lead the new government. The SPA stated that the new parliament will hold elections for a body that would write a new constitution.

The move was rejected by the Maoists. Baburam Bhattarai stated that merely restoring the parliament was not going to resolve the problems and that the rebels planned to continue fighting against government forces. They still demanded the formation of a Constituent Assembly and abolition of the monarchy.

On April 28, however, the Maoist insurgents responded to demands by Girija Prasad Koirala and announced a unilateral three-month truce in the Nepalese Civil War. In addition to this, on May 1, Bhattarai announced that if "the elections [to a Constituent Assembly] are free and fair, one has to respect the result of the elections. Then of course we will abide by the verdict of the people." This was seen as a large step forward as it shows the first signs of Maoist acceptance of the democratic process.

On May 2, Koirala announced the new government cabinet including himself and three other ministers from the Nepali Congress: K.P. Sharma Oli from CPN (UML), Gopal Man Shrestha from Nepali Congress (Democratic) and Prabhu Narayan Chaudhari from the United Left Front. This was followed on May 12 by the arrest of four ministers from the ousted royalist government and an investigation into alleged human rights violations by the army during the General Strike.

May 18 Act
The most dramatic move of the post-Loktantra Andolan government came on May 18, 2006, when the Parliament unanimously voted to strip the King of many of his powers. The bill included:

 Putting 90,000 troops in the hands of the parliament
 Imposing a tax on the royal family and its assets
 Ending the Raj Parishad, a royal advisory council
 Eliminating royal references from army and government titles
 Declaring Nepal a secular country, not a Hindu kingdom
 Scrapping the national anthem until a new one is composed
 Eliminating the king's position as the Supreme Commander of the Army

The act overrides the 1990 Constitution, written up following the Jana Andolan and has been described as a Nepalese Magna Carta. According to Prime Minister Koirala, "This proclamation represents the feelings of all the people."

May 18 has already been named Loktantrik Day (Democracy Day) by some.

Although the constitution was accepted, it was always intended to be temporary and on May 29, 2008, a new constitution was voted on by the Nepalese Parliament, which declared that the monarchy would be deposed and a new parliamentary republic would become the Nepalese political framework.

See also
 1990 People's Movement
 2020–2021 Nepalese protests
 Nepalese Civil War
 Office of Nepal Trust

References

External links

Nepal democracy crisis legal news and resources, JURIST
CNN – April 9
CNN – April 21
New York Times
Navhind Times
Scores of journalists detained – IFEX
Explaining Maoist Strategy: It's All In The Script by Dr Thomas A. Marks

History of Nepal (1951–2008)
Politics of Nepal
Democracy movement in Nepal
Democracy movement in Nepal
Protests in Nepal
Revolutionary movements
Nepalese democracy movements
Nonviolent revolutions
Nepalese Civil War